Muchelney is a clustered village and civil parish in Somerset, England, extending for  from the south bank of the River Parrett and that has a clustered centre. Its elevations range from 8 to 12 metres AOD. Muchelney has some orchards and a copse of remaining woodland in the centre-south covering between 2 and 5% of the land.

Established by the early medieval era, the community today has 78 homes, several of which are businesses such as farms. In culture, the mid-summer Lowland Games have been held nearby annually since 1984.

History
The village was recorded as Micelenie in the Domesday book meaning 'the increasingly great island' from the Old English micel and from the Norsk Øe. The  -ey or -y suffix served as the old English designation for "island", and thus is common to many of the villages in this area of the Somerset Levels, which stood as islands just above the marshes, which have since been drained.

The parish of Muchelney was part of the Pitney Hundred.

The village is best known as the site of Muchelney Abbey, a Benedictine abbey founded by King Athelstan in 939, and largely demolished in the Dissolution of the Monasteries. Architectural details of houses in the surrounding area are thought to incorporate fragments scavenged when the Abbey was destroyed.

The remains of Muchelney Abbey, including Tudor monks' quarters, and exhibits, are managed by English Heritage. Other tourist attractions in Muchelney include the parish church of St Peter and St Paul; the Priest's House (built in 1308 and now managed by the National Trust), and the pottery of artist John Leach.

Governance
The parish council has responsibility for local issues, including setting an annual precept (local rate) to cover the council’s operating costs and producing annual accounts for public scrutiny. The parish council evaluates local planning applications and works with the local police, district council officers, and neighbourhood watch groups on matters of crime, security, and traffic. The parish council's role also includes initiating projects for the maintenance and repair of parish facilities, as well as consulting with the district council on the maintenance, repair, and improvement of highways, drainage, footpaths, public transport, and street cleaning. Conservation matters (including trees and listed buildings) and environmental issues are also the responsibility of the council.

The village falls within the non-metropolitan district of South Somerset, which was formed on 1 April 1974 under the Local Government Act 1972, having previously been part of Langport Rural District. The district council is responsible for local planning and building control, local roads, council housing, environmental health, markets and fairs, refuse collection and recycling, cemeteries and crematoria, leisure services, parks, and tourism.

Somerset County Council is responsible for running the largest and most expensive local services such as education, social services, libraries, main roads, public transport, policing and  fire services, trading standards, waste disposal and strategic planning.

It is also part of the Somerton and Frome county constituency represented in the House of Commons of the Parliament of the United Kingdom. It elects one Member of Parliament (MP) by the first past the post system of election.

Geography and economy
To the east is Wet Moor, a biological Site of Special Scientific Interest, which forms part of the extensive grazing marsh grasslands and ditch systems of the Somerset Levels and Moors.

Muchelney is much subdivided in terms of fields and has a copse of natural woodland covering between 2 and 5% of its land in the middle of the south, the least inhabited area.  A small minority of homes are not in the main centre but instead along the south-eastward leading street and these are locally known as Muchelney Ham.  Many of the homes have agricultural farms or smallholdings, and some of the fields are orchards.  The community has an active church, a hand-made pottery business and a boarding cattery.

Nearest places

Incidence and prevention of flooding
Flooding historically relates here to the name of the county, Somerset, which before provision of engineered (straightened and deepened) rivers saw winter flooding across swathes of its central Levels area, giving its folk the uniquely seasonal descriptor 'of the summer'.  Without engineered channels parts of the upper part of the levels (such as the northern half of this parish) flood after heavy rainfall, often sufficiently deep to cut off all access. To counter this residents of the main community (i.e. in the north) typically pre-emptively move their vehicles away from their village (such as to the south of the parish or north of the next). When the floods arrive they then share rides on a local tractor to get to their cars. In this way they can get food, supplies and get to work. However they are not always prepared for early flooding. In the national floods of November 2012 access to the village was cut off for six days without such action and floodwater in the north was too deep even for tractors. Rescue boats reached the village on 29 November, rescuing nearly 100 people. Rescue boats were again required to supply the village during the rain and storms from Cyclone Dirk during Christmas 2013/New Year 2014. On 24 January 2014, in light of floods of the Somerset levels unprecedented for several decades and forecast new rainfall, Somerset County Council and Sedgemoor DC declared a major incident. At this time, the village had been cut off by flood water for almost a month as part of the Winter flooding of 2013–14 on the Somerset Levels.

Demography

Religious sites
St Peter and St Paul Parish Church, adjacent to Muchelney Abbey, has a ceiling enlivened with Jacobean paintings of bare-breasted angels, their nudity thought to symbolize innocent purity. It has a three-stage Somerset tower supported by pairs of full-height corner buttresses. The south-east octagonal stair turret leads to an outer door.

Culture
A highlight of the summer in Muchelney and adjacent Thorney is the mid-summer Lowland Games, a light-hearted adaptation of the Highland games, since 1984. Events have included (hay) bale racing, raft racing, ferret racing, wellie tossing, a dog show, 10k flour trail run, tug-of-war, equestrian exhibitions, mud wrestling, and a battle of the bands (with the winning act getting a gig at the Glastonbury Festival).

Notes and references
References

Notes

External links

English Heritage site for Muchelney Abbey
National Trust's site for the Muchelney Priest's House

Villages in South Somerset
Somerset Levels
Civil parishes in Somerset